Music for Madame is a 1937 American musical comedy film directed by John G. Blystone and written by Gertrude Purcell and Robert Harari. The film was released on October 8, 1937 by RKO Pictures.

Plot
Singer Nino Maretti comes into Hollywood and is tricked by jewel thieves into distracting a rich audience, now he has to prove his innocence.

Cast 
 Nino Martini as Nino Maretti
 Joan Fontaine as Jean Clemens
 Alan Mowbray as Leon Rodowsky
 Billy Gilbert as Krause
 Alan Hale, Sr. as Detective Flugelman
 Grant Mitchell as District Attorney Ernest Robinson
 Erik Rhodes as Spaghetti Nadzio
 Lee Patrick as Nora Burns
 Romo Vincent as Gas Truck Driver
 Frank Conroy as Morton Harding
 Bradley Page as Rollins
 George Shelley as Mr. Barret 
 Jack Carson as Assistant Director

References

External links

 
 
 
 

1937 films
American black-and-white films
Films directed by John G. Blystone
1937 musical comedy films
American musical comedy films
Films scored by Nathaniel Shilkret
1930s English-language films
1930s American films